The Hunter 22 is an American trailerable sailboat that was designed by the Hunter Design Team and first built in 1981.

Production
The design was built by Hunter Marine in the United States between 1981 and 1985, but it is now out of production.

Design
The Hunter 22 is a recreational keelboat, built predominantly of fiberglass, with wood trim. It has a masthead sloop rig, a raked stem, a vertical transom, a transom-hung rudder controlled by a tiller and a fixed fin keel or centerboard. It is normally fitted with a small  outboard motor for docking and maneuvering.

Standard factory equipment included a stove and cooler, a teak and holly wooden cabin sole, a dinette table and portable head, a  fresh water tank, outboard motor bracket, life jackets and an anchor.

The design has sleeping accommodation for four people, with a double "V"-berth in the bow cabin and two straight settee berths in the main cabin. The galley is located on both sides of the companionway ladder. The galley is equipped with a single-burner stove and a sink. The head is located in the bow cabin on the starbord side under the "V"-berth.

Operational history
In a 2010 review Steve Henkel wrote, "...construction was on the light side, featuring plastic hatch hinges and low-end hardware. Best features: With her big beam, the boat has good space for weekend cruising. Theoretical speed is highest among comp[etitor]s as a result of a relatively long waterline, though low SA/D ratio indicates she will not be fast in light air ... Worst features: ... Owners complain that weather helm be annoying in winds over ten knots. In reality this may be a result of not reefing the main when the breeze pipes up. Owners also complain that, in waves, the outboard prop tends to come out of the water and cavitate."

Variants
Hunter 22 Fixed Keel
The boat has a PHRF racing average handicap of 255 with a high of 258 and low of 252.
Hunter 22 Centerboard
The boat has a PHRF racing average handicap of 255 with a high of 251 and low of 270.

See also
List of sailing boat types

Related development
Marlow-Hunter 22

Similar sailboats
Alberg 22
Cape Dory 22
Capri 22
Catalina 22
CS 22
DS-22
Falmouth Cutter 22
Edel 665
J/22
Marshall 22
Nonsuch 22
Pearson Electra
Pearson Ensign
Santana 22
Seaward 22
Spindrift 22
Starwind 223
Tanzer 22
US Yachts US 22

References

External links
Official brochure

Keelboats
1980s sailboat type designs
Sailing yachts
Trailer sailers
Sailboat type designs by Hunter Design Team
Sailboat types built by Hunter Marine